The Stampede World Mid-Heavyweight Championship was a professional wrestling title, one of the lesser known secondary titles created for Stampede Wrestling in 1959, and was the focal point of the 1982-83 feud between the Dynamite Kid and the Great Gama. The title would be defended for roughly four years, although being recognized by the promotion until it was abandoned some time around October 1985, when Dynamite Kid (who was wrestling in the WWF at that point) was last recognized as still holding the title. There have been a total of six recognized champions who have had a combined 11 official reigns.

Title history

Footnotes

References

World professional wrestling championships

External links

Stampede Wrestling championships
Mid-Heavyweight wrestling championships